Baldeogarh is a town and a nagar panchayat in Tikamgarh district  in the state of Madhya Pradesh, India.

Geography
It has an average elevation of 319 metres (1046 feet).
The headquarters town of the Baldeogarh is a tehsil of the same name.

Demographics
 India census, Baldeogarh had a population of 7,585. Males constitute 52% of the population and females 48%. Baldeogarh has an average literacy rate of 51%, lower than the national average of 59.5%; with 62% of the males and 38% of females literate. 20% of the population is under 6 years of age.

References

Cities and towns in Tikamgarh district
Tourist attractions in Tikamgarh district